Wang Zhongyu is the atonal pinyin romanization of various Chinese names and may refer to:

Wang Zhongyu (painter) ( 14th century), Chinese painter under the Ming dynasty
Wang Zhongyu (politician, born 1891), politician of the Republic of China
Wang Zhongyu (politician, born 1933), engineer and politician of the People's Republic of China
Wang Chung-yu (born 1945), Taiwanese politician